Simbarashe "Simba" Nhivi Sithole (born January 10, 1991), commonly known as Simba Nhivi, is a Zimbabwean footballer who plays as a striker for Zimbabwe Premier Soccer League side Dynamos and the Zimbabwe national team.

Career

Club
Nhivi's career started in Zimbabwe with Shooting Stars, he left Shooting Stars in 2011 to join CAPS United. His move to CAPS Utd led to a transfer outside his homeland for the first time as he agreed to join Premier Soccer League side Mamelodi Sundowns. However, Nhivi's spell with the Sundowns was unsuccessful as he left in 2012 without making a single appearance. His next move was back to Zimbabwe to join Dynamos, a year later he left for South Africa again but this time joined SuperSport United. He made 5 league appearances for SuperSport Utd before rejoining Dynamos soon after.

International
Nhivi has won 10 caps for the Zimbabwe national team and scored one goal for his nation, which came versus Mozambique in 2013.

Career statistics

International
.

International goals
. Scores and results list Zimbabwe's goal tally first.

Honours

Club
Dynamos
 Zimbabwe Premier Soccer League (3): 2012, 2013, 2014
CAPS United
 Zimbabwe Premier Soccer League (1): 2016

References

External links
 
 
 

1991 births
Living people
Sportspeople from Masvingo
Association football forwards
Zimbabwean footballers
Shooting Stars F.C. (Zimbabwe) players
CAPS United players
Mamelodi Sundowns F.C. players
Dynamos F.C. players
SuperSport United F.C. players
Cape Town Spurs F.C. players
Singida United F.C. players
Ngezi Platinum F.C. players
Zimbabwe international footballers
Zimbabwean expatriate footballers
Expatriate soccer players in South Africa
Zimbabwean expatriate sportspeople in South Africa
Expatriate footballers in Tanzania
Zimbabwean expatriate sportspeople in Tanzania
Tanzanian Premier League players
Zimbabwe A' international footballers
2011 African Nations Championship players